Oleeae is a tribe of flowering plants in the olive family, Oleaceae.

Genera

References

External links

 
Asterid tribes